"Bullet from a Gun" is a song performed by English rapper Skepta. It was released as the second single from Skepta's fifth studio album Ignorance Is Bliss on 9 May 2019 through Boy Better Know. The song peaked at number 32 on the UK Singles Chart.

Music video
A music video to accompany the release of "Bullet from a Gun" was first released onto YouTube on 26 May 2019.

Charts

Certifications

Release history

References

2019 songs
2019 singles
Skepta songs
Songs written by Skepta